Ishlykly is a traditional dish similar to pizza but covered with dough. It consists of a two-layer dough stuffed with a mixture of meat (most commonly mutton) and vegetables, and is often prepared for special guests especially in Turkmenistan, Afghanistan and other places where Turkmens live.

Turkmenistan cuisine
Afghan cuisine